Puff Kuo (born 30 June 1988) is a Taiwanese actress, singer, model, and was the youngest member of Taiwanese girl group Dream Girls until their disbandment.

In 2008, Kuo was scouted by talent agents and in 2010, she joined girl group Dream Girls. In 2011, Dream Girls released their debut EP and in the same year, Kuo appeared in her debut television series Inborn Pair.

Early life
Kuo was born on 30 June 1988 in Gongliao Township, Taipei County, Taiwan. Her mother died from breast cancer when she was 9, leaving her and her younger sister to be cared for by relatives while her father worked in China for many years..

Career

2008–2010
Kuo debuted as a commercial model in 2008. Her first television appearance was in a McDonald's commercial that aired in Taiwan. After her commercial appearance, she was discovered by Dorian Entertainment, which she signed on as her management company. During this time, she and future group members Tia Lee and Emily Song of Dream Girls were under training before officially debuting as a group. Kuo had several appearances in variety shows such as Guess, 100% Entertainment, and Kangxi Lai Le and appeared in numerous music videos.

2011–2012
In December 2011, Kuo had her first acting role in SETTV's drama Inborn Pair, playing the supporting role of the daughter of a triad boss. Inborn Pair was a ratings success and saw the boost in popularity of its stars.

In 2012, Kuo starred in her first film, Silent Code. That same year she starred in another SETTV drama entitled Miss Rose, playing the supporting role of a spoiled fiancee to lead actor Roy Chiu's character. In December, Dream Girls released their second group EP Girl's Talk.

2013–present
In 2013, Kuo made a cameo appearance in Fabulous Boys, the Taiwanese remake of the popular Korean idol drama You're Beautiful. That same year she also got her first lead role, opposite Aaron Yan in SETTV's Just You, playing the role Cheng Liang Liang. The Kuo and Yan pairing was well received, and the two won the "Best Screen Couple Award" at the 2013 Sanlih Drama Awards. The same year in December, Dream Girls released their debut studio album.

At the beginning of 2014, Kuo became a part of the second season of We Got Married Global Edition. Super Junior's Kim Heechul appeared as Kuo's partner in the variety show. Her appearance on the variety show helped boost her popularity outside of Taiwan.

In April 2014 Kuo was cast in Pleasantly Surprised. In Pleasantly Surprised, Kuo starred opposite popular male model and actor Jasper Liu, whom she first met and previously collaborated with for a short comedy skit at the 2013 Golden Bell Awards presentation show, where they played a couple as leads in a romantic idol drama. For her role in Pleasantly Surprised, she played an aspiring French chef with a cold and calm demeanor who eventually opens up and falls in love with her handsome sunshiny co-worker played by Liu. Kuo and Liu's chemistry as a screen couple was successful and well received by critics and viewers. The two won the "Best Kiss" award at the 2014 Sanlih drama awards. Kuo also showed that her popularity was rising outside of Taiwan when she won the "China Wave Award" at the same ceremony.

Music

After Kuo's group Dream Girls signed on March 23, 2011 with Linfair Records, they debuted on April 8 with the release of their EP Dream Girls (美夢當前). The group's second album, titled "Girl's Talk," debuted on 7 December 2012.

After starring in We Got Married Global Edition, Kuo's popularity soared in South Korea and her group Dream Girls was the only Taiwanese music act invited to the "2014 Asia Song Festival" held in Busan, South Korea. Kuo served as a guest emcee at the event.

In late 2014, after Pleasantly Surprised finished filming, Kuo took a break from acting to work on Dream Girls' next album and a photo book that was scheduled for release in December 2014.

Personal life
When growing up Kuo was raised by her father's relatives while her younger sister lived with her mother's relatives. Kuo and her younger sister were estranged from each other until Kuo entered the entertainment industry and was able to provide for her sister.

Kuo is a cat lover who owns 3 cats, one of whom she rescued on a busy highway and later adopted.

Filmography

Television series

Feature film

Short film

Appearance on Variety Shows

Music video appearances

Discography

Studio album

Single

Awards and nominations

References

External links

 Puff Kuo on Weibo

 Puff Kuo on douban.com
 Puff Kuo on chinesemov.com

1988 births
Taiwanese female models
Taiwanese film actresses
Taiwanese television actresses
21st-century Taiwanese actresses
21st-century Taiwanese singers
Living people
21st-century Taiwanese women singers